Bending machine may refer to:
 Bending Machine (flat metal bending) 
 Brake (sheet metal bending), a metalworking machine that allows the bending of sheet metal